Abraham Lévy-Bacrat (אברהם הלוי בקראט; fl. 1492–1507) was a rabbinical author of the beginning of the sixteenth century. Expelled from Spain in 1492, he settled at Tunis, where in 1507 he wrote Sefer ha-Zikkaron, a supercommentary on Rashi. The manuscript remained unprinted till 1845, when it was discovered in a Jewish library in Tunis. The work has several prefaces, one of which, written by the author himself, recounts his sufferings at the time of the expulsion from Spain.

Jewish Encyclopedia bibliography 
David Cazès, Notes Bibliographiques sur la Littérature Juive Tunisienne

References

Jewish writers
Spanish rabbis
15th-century births
16th-century deaths
Jews expelled from Spain in 1492